Rebryk, Rebrik is a surname of Ukrainian origin. Notable people with the surname include:

Bohdan Rebryk (1938–2023), Ukrainian politician
Denys Rebryk (born 1985), Ukrainian footballer
Vera Rebrik (born 1989), Ukrainian-born Russian track and field athlete

Ukrainian-language surnames